This is a list of neighborhoods in Arlington County, Virginia. Under Virginia law, towns may be incorporated within counties; however, the state does not permit the creation of any new incorporated towns within a county that has a population density greater than 1,000 persons per square mile. As such, Arlington has no incorporated towns within its borders, but a number of neighborhoods within Arlington are commonly referred to by name as if they were distinct towns. This list includes:

 
Neighborhoods